Popchev or Poptchev is a Bulgarian surname, its female form Popcheva or Poptcheva. Notable people with the surname include: 

Eva-Maria Poptcheva
Milko Popchev
Steliyan Popchev

Bulgarian-language surnames